New Market West is a suburban housing community in Frederick County, in the U.S. state of Maryland. The community is located in the foothills of the Blue Ridge Mountains and is adjacent to the town of New Market.

Geography
New Market West is in east-central Frederick County bordered to the south, east, and north by the town of New Market and to the west by the Linganore census-designated place. Two streams, Cherry Run and Walnut Run, run through the community. The primary access to the community is via Royal Oak Drive from MD 144.

Education
The community's residents feed into three schools in the Frederick County Public School system: New Market Elementary School, New Market Middle School, and Linganore High School.

Climate
New Market West is located in the north eastern humid subtropical climate zone (Köppen Cfa), with hot, humid summers and moderately cold winters. The community of New Market West is located in the Piedmont of the Appalachian Mountains.

References

External links
New Market West Community site
New Market West location map

Unincorporated communities in Frederick County, Maryland
Unincorporated communities in Maryland